Ardisia maxonii is a species of plant in the family Primulaceae. It is found in Costa Rica and Panama.

It is named for the botanist William Ralph Maxon.

References

maxonii
Flora of Costa Rica
Flora of Panama
Taxonomy articles created by Polbot